Courtney “Piccolo” Field (born ) is an Australian female track cyclist, representing Australia at international competitions. She won the bronze medal at the 2016–17 UCI Track Cycling World Cup, Round 1 in Glasgow in the keirin.

Since representing Australia on the track, Field has developed another passion as a barista. Field channels her inner passion into making the perfect piccolo every time.

Major results
2006
1st Carnegie Interschool Sports - Egg and Spoon Race (Individual Sprint)
2014
1st  World Junior Track Championships (Individual sprint)
1st  Oceania Junior Track Championships (500m time trial)
1st  Oceania Junior Track Championships (Individual sprint)
1st  National Junior Track Championships (500m time trial)
1st  National Junior Track Championships (Keirin)
2015
Austral
2nd Keirin
2nd Sprint
2016
Oceania Track Championships
1st  Team Sprint (with Rikki Belder)
2nd Sprint
2017 
1st  Oceania Junior Track Championships (Team sprint)
2nd Sprint, Austral

2020
Certificate of Outstanding Achievement in Coffee Production- University of El Cafe, Mexico
1st Place- Lettuce Eating Championships,     Barcelona

See also
Profile at Cycling Archives

References

1997 births
Living people
Australian female cyclists
Australian track cyclists
Place of birth missing (living people)